In mathematics a Yetter–Drinfeld category is a special type of braided monoidal category.  It consists of modules over a Hopf algebra which satisfy some additional axioms.

Definition 

Let H be a Hopf algebra over a field k. Let  denote the coproduct and S the antipode of H. Let V be a vector space over k. Then V is called a (left left) Yetter–Drinfeld module over H if

  is a left H-module, where  denotes the left action of H on V,
  is a left H-comodule, where  denotes the left coaction of H on V,
 the maps  and  satisfy the compatibility condition
 for all ,

Examples 

 Any left H-module over a cocommutative Hopf algebra H is a Yetter–Drinfeld module with the trivial left coaction .
 If H is the group algebra kG of an abelian group G, then Yetter–Drinfeld modules over H are precisely the G-graded G-modules. This means that
,
where each  is a G-submodule of V.
 More generally, if the group G is not abelian, then  Yetter–Drinfeld modules over H=kG are G-modules with a G-gradation
, such that .
 
 As G-module take  to be the induced module of : 
 
(this can be proven easily not to depend on the choice of g)
 To define the G-graduation (comodule) assign any element  to the graduation layer:

 It is very custom to directly construct  as direct sum of X´s and write down the G-action by choice of a specific set of representatives  for the -cosets. From this approach, one often writes 

(this notation emphasizes the graduation, rather than the module structure)

Braiding 

Let H be a Hopf algebra with invertible antipode S, and let V, W be Yetter–Drinfeld modules over H. Then the map ,

is invertible with inverse

Further, for any three Yetter–Drinfeld modules U, V, W the map c satisfies the braid relation

A monoidal category  consisting of Yetter–Drinfeld modules over a Hopf algebra H with bijective antipode is called a Yetter–Drinfeld category. It is a braided monoidal category with the braiding c above.

References 

 

Hopf algebras
Quantum groups
Monoidal categories